Mohammad Hasan may refer to:

 Mohamad Hasan (politician) (born 1956), Malaysian politician
 Mohammad Hasan (cricketer) (born 1990), Pakistani cricketer
 Mohammad Hasan Rahmani (c. 1963–2016), Afghan Taliban leader
 Mohammad Rakibul Hasan (born 1977), Bangladeshi photojournalist and filmmaker

See also
 Mohammed Hassan (disambiguation)
 Muhammad Hassan (disambiguation)